Semiz Mehmed Pasha (1596 – July 1646) was an Ottoman grand vizier and a descendant of Suleiman the Magnificent.

Biography
He was born in 1596. His father, Sultanzade Abdurrahman Bey, was a son of Ayşe Hümaşah Sultan, daughter of Rüstem Pasha and Mihrimah Sultan. His mother was Ayşe Hanım, a daughter of Cığalazade Yusuf Sinan Pasha. He was a great-great-grandson of Sultan Suleiman the Magnificent and Hurrem Sultan.

Early years 
In 1637, he was appointed as the governor of Egypt. Three years later, during the reign of İbrahim, he returned to İstanbul as a vizier in the Ottoman divan. In 1641, he was appointed as the governor of Özü (modern Ochakiv in Ukraine) and tasked with capturing the fort of Azak (modern Azov in Russia), which had recently been lost to the Cossacks. He was successful in recapturing the fort. In 1643, he was appointed as the governor of Damascus (in modern Syria). This appointment was probably due to the secret power struggle between him and the grand vizier, Kemankeş Mustafa Pasha.

As Grand Vizier 
In 1644, he succeeded the grand vizier Kemankeş Mustafa Pasha, who was executed. Kemankeş Mustafa Pasha was a victim of palace intrigues and a quack hodja named Djindji Khodja. Well aware of hodja's influence on the sultan and the tragedy of the previous grand vizier, he was too cautious in governance and became an ineffective grand vizier. He became a yes man of the sultan. According to Lord Kinross, one day the sultan asked why he never opposed any opinion to which he replied, "Every opinion of the sultan has a deep aphorism even if subjects are unable to understand." Although he was against declaring war on the Republic of Venice, his cautious objections were not taken into consideration and the Cretan War (1645–1669) soon began in 1645, which was financially disastrous to both sides.

Later years 
In 1645, Sultan Ibrahim deposed him. His next mission was on the island of Crete (in modern Greece), which was the theatre of the recently started war as the commander of the army but he soon died of natural causes.

See also 
List of Ottoman grand viziers
Turks in Kosovo
Sultanzade

References 

Year of birth uncertain
1646 deaths
17th-century Grand Viziers of the Ottoman Empire
17th-century Ottoman governors of Egypt
Pashas
Ottoman princes
Kosovan Turks